

Major League Baseball
World Series: Minnesota Twins over St. Louis Cardinals (4–3); Frank Viola, MVP

American League Championship Series: Gary Gaetti, MVP
National League Championship Series: Jeffrey Leonard, MVP
All-Star Game, July 14 at Oakland–Alameda County Coliseum: National League, 2–0 (13 innings); Tim Raines, MVP

Other champions
Caribbean World Series: Criollos de Caguas (Puerto Rico)
College World Series: Stanford
Japan Series: Seibu Lions over Yomiuri Giants (4–2)
Korean Series: Haitai Tigers over Samsung Lions
Big League World Series: Taipei, Taiwan
Junior League World Series: Rowland Heights, California
Little League World Series: Hua Lian, Taiwan
Pan American Games: Cuba over USA
Senior League World Series: Athens, Ohio

Awards and honors
Baseball Hall of Fame
Ray Dandridge
Catfish Hunter
Billy Williams
Most Valuable Player
George Bell, Toronto Blue Jays, OF (AL)
Andre Dawson, Chicago Cubs, OF (NL)
Cy Young Award
Roger Clemens, Boston Red Sox (AL)
Steve Bedrosian, Philadelphia Phillies (NL)
Rookie of the Year
Mark McGwire, Oakland Athletics, 1B (AL)
Benito Santiago, San Diego Padres, C (NL)
Manager of the Year Award
Sparky Anderson, Detroit Tigers (AL)
Buck Rodgers, Montreal Expos (NL)
Woman Executive of the Year (major or minor league): Leslie Leary, Auburn Astros, New York–Penn League
Gold Glove Award
Don Mattingly (1B) (AL)
Frank White (2B) (AL)
Gary Gaetti (3B) (AL)
Tony Fernández (SS) (AL)
Jesse Barfield (OF) (AL)
Gary Pettis (OF) (AL)
Kirby Puckett (OF) (AL)
Bob Boone (C) (AL)
Mark Langston (P) (AL)
Keith Hernandez (1B) (NL)
Ryne Sandberg (2B) (NL)
Terry Pendleton (3B) (NL)
Ozzie Smith (SS) (NL)
Eric Davis (OF) (NL)
Andre Dawson (OF) (NL)
Tony Gwynn (OF) (NL)
Mike LaValliere (C) (NL)
Rick Reuschel (P) (NL)

MLB statistical leaders

Major League Baseball final standings

Draft

Events

January
January 14 – Catfish Hunter and Billy Williams are elected to the Hall of Fame by the Baseball Writers' Association of America.

February
February 25 – Baseball Commissioner Peter Ueberroth suspends San Diego Padres pitcher LaMarr Hoyt from baseball following his third arrest on drug possession charges, this time on the U.S.-Mexico border. Hoyt is sentenced to 45 days in jail on December 16, 1986. An arbitrator cuts Hoyt's suspension to sixty days in mid-June and orders the Padres to reinstate him. The Padres, however, give him his unconditional release the following day.

March
March 3 – Ray Dandridge, a third baseman from the Negro leagues, is the only player elected to the Hall of Fame by the Special Veterans Committee.
March 27 – The New York Mets acquire David Cone and Chris Jelic from the Kansas City Royals in exchange for Rick Anderson, Mauro Gozzo and Ed Hearn.

April
April 6 – Al Campanis, general manager of the Los Angeles Dodgers and a former teammate of Jackie Robinson, appears on the ABC news program Nightline to discuss the progress of racial integration of baseball as the fortieth anniversary of Robinson's first game approaches. When asked by Nightline host Ted Koppel why more African-Americans do not become managers or executives, Campanis states that blacks lack certain qualities for those jobs, drawing the ire of host Koppel. Campanis is fired by the Dodgers two days later.
April 13 – At Jack Murphy Stadium, the San Diego Padres set a major league record when the first three batters in the bottom of the first inning hit home runs off San Francisco Giants starter Roger Mason in their home opener. The Padres, trailing 2–0, got homers from Marvell Wynne, Tony Gwynn and John Kruk.
April 15 – Juan Nieves of the Milwaukee Brewers pitches a no-hitter against the Baltimore Orioles. Nieves becomes the second-youngest pitcher in major league history to accomplish the feat (22 years, 4 months, 10 days), as well as the first Brewer to do it.
April 17 – Mike Schmidt of the Philadelphia Phillies hits the 500th home run of his career. It comes in the ninth inning against the Pittsburgh Pirates' Don Robinson, giving the Phillies an 8–6 win at Pittsburgh.

May

June
June 1 – Knuckleballer Phil Niekro of the Cleveland Indians beats the Detroit Tigers, 9–6. This is his 314th major league victory for Niekro, which paired him with brother Joe a current total of 216 wins, making them the winningest pitching brother duo, surpassing the 529 wins posted by Gaylord Perry and Jim Perry. The Niekros will finish their careers with a combined 539 wins.
June 2 – The Seattle Mariners use the number-one overall pick of the 1987 MLB draft to select Ken Griffey Jr., signaling a turnaround in their fortunes as an organization.
June 17 – Former Kansas City Royals manager Dick Howser dies of brain cancer at age 51.  Howser had attempted to manage the team at the start of spring training, but found he was physically too weak and was replaced by Billy Gardner.
June 22 – With their starting rotation decimated by injuries, the New York Mets seek help from Tom Seaver, who is not offered a contract to his liking following the  season, whose salary was $1 million. Then the Boston Red Sox offer him $500,000, which Seaver also declines. Though no actual contract is signed, Seaver joins the Red Sox on June 6, and is hit hard on during an exhibition game against the Triple-A Tidewater Tides on June 11. After similarly poor outings on the 16th and 20th, he announces his retirement.
June 28 – Don Baylor of the visiting Boston Red Sox is hit by a pitch from Rick Rhoden in the sixth inning of a 6–2 win over the New York Yankees. The HBP gives Baylor 244 for his career, breaking a modern-day record set by Ron Hunt.

July
July 14 – Tim Raines caps a 3-for-3 performance in the All-Star Game with a two-run triple in the top of the 13th inning, giving the National League a 2–0 victory over the American League. Raines is selected the MVP.
July 18 – New York Yankees first baseman Don Mattingly homers in his record-tying eighth straight game, in a 7–2 Texas Rangers win over the Yankees.  He ties the record set by Dale Long in 1956.

August
August 2 – At Royals Stadium, Kevin Seitzer goes 6-for-6 with two home runs and seven runs batted in the Kansas City Royals' 13–5 victory over the Boston Red Sox.
August 11 – Mark McGwire of the Oakland Athletics breaks Al Rosen's American League rookie record by hitting his 38th home run in an 8–2 loss to the Mariners.
August 26 – Paul Molitor of the Milwaukee Brewers goes hitless, and ends his 39-game hitting streak. It is the longest American League hitting streak since Joe DiMaggio's 56-game streak (a major league record) in 1941.
August 30 – With knuckleball pitcher Charlie Hough on the mound, Texas Rangers catcher Geno Petralli ties a Major League record by committing six passed balls in a 7–0 loss to the Detroit Tigers at Tiger Stadium. All seven runs are unearned and come as a result of the passed balls.

September
September 9 – Nolan Ryan strikes out 16 to pass 4,500 for his career as the Houston Astros beat the San Francisco Giants 4–2. Ryan strikes out 12 of the final 13 batters and fans Mike Aldrete to complete the seventh inning for his 4,500th strikeout.
September 14 – In the midst of the Toronto Blue Jays' 18–3 drubbing of the Baltimore Orioles at Exhibition Stadium, Cal Ripken Jr. is lifted from the lineup and replaced by Ron Washington, stopping Ripken's consecutive innings played streak at 8,243. In this same game, Toronto hits ten home runs to set a Major League single-game record. Ernie Whitt connects on three of the home runs, Rance Mulliniks and George Bell two each, and Fred McGriff, Lloyd Moseby and Rob Ducey one each.
September 18 – Darrell Evans hits his 30th home run of the season, and becomes the first player to do so after the age of 40.
September 21 – Darryl Strawberry steals his 30th base of the season to join the 30–30 club. With teammate Howard Johnson already having joined, it marks the first time that two teammates achieve 30–30 seasons in the same year.
September 22 – Wade Boggs of the Boston Red Sox reaches the 200-hit mark for the fifth straight season in an 8–5 loss to the Detroit Tigers.
September 27 – Four days after being signed as a free agent and almost a month after being released by the Toronto Blue Jays, 48-year-old Hall of Famer Phil Niekro pitches in his final major league game for the Atlanta Braves.  Niekro starts the game against the San Francisco Giants, pitches three innings, and gives up six hits and five runs.
September 28 – Kevin Seitzer becomes the first rookie since Tony Oliva and Dick Allen in 1964 to collect 200 hits in a season.

October
October 4 – The Detroit Tigers defeat the Toronto Blue Jays 1–0 to clinch the American League East division title. The victory caps off a thrilling pennant race in which the Tigers overcome a 3.5 game deficit to the Blue Jays in the last two weeks of the season, including sweeping the Blue Jays at Tiger Stadium in the final weekend, and finishing two games ahead of Toronto in the standings.
October 19 – After a disappointing fourth-place finish, New York Yankees' owner George Steinbrenner decides to promote manager Lou Piniella to general manager and hires Billy Martin as manager for the fifth time for the 1988 season.
October 25 – In Game Seven of the World Series, starter Frank Viola and reliever Jeff Reardon hold the St. Louis Cardinals to six hits, as the Minnesota Twins win 4–2 for their first World Championship. The franchise's last title came in 1924 as the Washington Senators. Viola is named the Series MVP.
October 28 - Buck Rodgers of the Montreal Expos was named National League Manager of the Year by the Baseball Writers Associated of America. Rodgers received 92 points. Roger Craig of the San Francisco Giants finished second with 65 points.

November
November 3 – Mark McGwire who hit a then MLB rookie record of 49 home runs was the unanimous choice for the American League Rookie of the Year. Only the second time that happened (Carlton Fisk was the other in 1972).
November 10 – In the closest vote in Cy Young Award history, Steve Bedrosian of the Philadelphia Phillies edges Rick Sutcliffe of the Chicago Cubs, 57–55, to win the National League honors. Bedrosian posts a 5–3 record with a 2.83 ERA and 40 saves, while Sutcliffe finishes 18–10 with a 3.68 ERA and 174 strikeouts. Bedrosian is the third relief pitcher ever to win the award in the NL, joining Mike Marshall and Bruce Sutter.
November 18 – Andre Dawson of the Chicago Cubs is announced as the winner of the National League MVP Award, becoming the first recipient of the award to play for a last place team.

December
December 1 – Free agent outfielder Brett Butler is signed by the San Francisco Giants. Butler hit .295 with nine home runs, 41 RBI, and 33 stolen bases for the Cleveland Indians in this season.

Movies
Long Gone (TV)

Births

January
January 2 – Dave Sappelt
January 7 – Brandon Bantz
January 7 – Kyle Hudson
January 10 – Ryan Dennick
January 10 – Paolo Espino
January 10 – Alberto Rosario
January 12 – Iván Nova
January 13 – Oliver Drake 
January 14 – Logan Forsythe
January 16 – Zelous Wheeler
January 17 – Jeff Beliveau
January 17 – Cody Decker
January 17 – Tanner Scheppers
January 19 – James Darnell
January 20 – Luis Exposito
January 21 – Brandon Crawford
January 21 – Chase d'Arnaud
January 21 – Jake Diekman
January 21 – Roger Kieschnick
January 21 – Josh Wall
January 23 – Cord Phelps
January 26 – Héctor Noesí
January 26 – Jemile Weeks
January 28 – José Ceda
January 29 – José Abreu
January 29 – Alex Avila
January 30 – Luis García
January 30 – Tyler Moore
January 31 – Melky Mesa
January 31 – Caleb Thielbar

February
February 1 – Austin Jackson
February 1 – Joe Mahoney
February 5 – Mark Hamburger
February 6 – Pedro Álvarez
February 6 – Travis Wood
February 11 – Brian Matusz
February 12 – David Cooper
February 12 – Argenis Díaz
February 13 – Ryan Buchter
February 13 – Curtis Partch
February 13 – Ryan Perry
February 13 – Henry Urrutia
February 15 – Rob Scahill
February 16 – Tom Milone
February 17 – Danny Farquhar
February 19 – Josh Reddick
February 22 – Tommy Field
February 22 – Carlos Peguero
February 25 – Phil Irwin
February 25 – Henry Rodríguez
February 25 – Andrew Werner
February 28 – Aaron Thompson

March
March 4 – Dan Cortes
March 7 – Joel Carreño
March 9 – Daniel Hudson
March 10 – Charles Leesman
March 14 – Blaine Hardy
March 21 – Michael Brady
March 21 – Carlos Carrasco
March 22 – Ike Davis
March 24 – Lucas Luetge
March 24 – Josh Zeid
March 25 – Hyun-jin Ryu
March 25 – Kirby Yates
March 27 – Buster Posey
March 28 – Bryan Morris
March 28 – Josh Zeid
March 30 – Mike Broadway
March 30 – Shairon Martis
March 31 – Peter Bourjos

April
April 2 – Brad Glenn
April 3 – Jay Bruce
April 3 – Jason Kipnis
April 4 – Odrisamer Despaigne
April 4 – Cameron Maybin
April 5 – Jung-ho Kang
April 8 – Yonder Alonso
April 8 – Jeremy Hellickson
April 9 – Eric Campbell
April 10 – Ryan Verdugo
April 16 – Richard Bleier
April 17 – Dan Jennings
April 20 – Dusty Coleman
April 20 – Ian Thomas
April 21 – Ryan Adams
April 21 – Brent Morel
April 22 – Tyson Ross
April 24 – Welington Castillo
April 25 – Danny Espinosa

May
May 1 – Iván DeJesús Jr.
May 6 – Gerardo Parra
May 10 – Brayan Villarreal
May 11 – Red Patterson
May 12 – Adam Liberatore
May 12 – Lance Lynn
May 13 – D. J. Mitchell
May 15 – David Adams
May 15 – Michael Brantley
May 15 – Brian Dozier
May 16 – Tyler Cloyd
May 21 – Allan Dykstra
May 22 – Jaye Chapman
May 24 – Blake Tekotte
May 24 – Henry Villar

June
June 5 – Manny Piña
June 7 – Sean Halton
June 11 – Ezequiel Carrera
June 13 – Justin Miller
June 15 – Jake Elmore
June 15 – Josh Lindblom
June 15 – Eduardo Núñez
June 16 – Arquimedes Caminero
June 18 – Jeremy Bleich
June 18 – Jason Castro
June 18 – J. B. Shuck
June 18 – Taylor Thompson
June 19 – Collin McHugh
June 24 – Juan Francisco
June 24 – Sam Freeman
June 29 – Jeremy Moore
June 30 – Ryan Cook
June 30 – Cole Figueroa

July
July 3 – Casey Coleman
July 3 – Zach Putnam
July 7 – Yangervis Solarte
July 8 – Christian Friedrich
July 8 – Josh Harrison
July 8 – Mason Tobin
July 9 – Rusney Castillo
July 10 – Jermaine Curtis
July 10 – Johnny Giavotella
July 10 – Gregory Infante
July 11 – Shun Yamaguchi
July 16 – Eric Surkamp
July 17 – Leonel Campos
July 17 – Nick Christiani
July 18 – Conor Gillaspie
July 19 – Yan Gomes
July 21 – Diego Moreno
July 26 – Alex Burnett
July 26 – Vidal Nuño
July 27 – Preston Guilmet
July 28 – Jae-gyun Hwang

August
August 2 – Juan Jaime
August 4 – Hiram Burgos
August 4 – Mike Freeman
August 4 – David Martínez
August 5 – Tim Federowicz
August 7 – Ryan Lavarnway
August 7 – Kirk Nieuwenhuis
August 7 – Josh Smith
August 7 – Rafael Ynoa
August 10 – Wilson Ramos
August 10 – Matt den Dekker
August 11 – Drew Storen
August 13 – Dustin Garneau
August 13 – J. J. Hoover
August 14 – Jeremy Hazelbaker
August 14 – David Peralta
August 15 – Jorge de León
August 17 – Thomas Neal
August 18 – Justin Wilson
August 21 – J. D. Martinez
August 23 – Zach Braddock
August 25 – Logan Morrison
August 25 – Murphy Smith
August 25 – Justin Upton
August 25 – Adam Warren
August 26 – Ryan Brasier
August 26 – Greg Halman
August 27 – Brett Bochy
August 31 – Stephen Cardullo
August 31 – Steve Johnson

September
September 1 – David Carpenter
September 1 – Sean O'Sullivan
September 1 – Trayvon Robinson
September 3 – Domonic Brown
September 3 – Drew Hayes
September 5 – Scott Barnes
September 7 – Gorkys Hernández
September 10 – Paul Goldschmidt
September 11 – Brandon Laird
September 21 – Jeremy Jeffress
September 23 – González Germen
September 23 – Xavier Scruggs
September 24 – Jake Goebbert
September 25 – Lars Anderson
September 25 – Vance Worley
September 27 – Grant Green
September 27 – David Hale
September 28 – Nick Greenwood
September 28 – Derrick Robinson
September 28 – Jerry Sands
September 29 – Alí Solís
September 30 – Kenley Jansen

October
October 1 – Erik Komatsu
October 2 – Rafael Lopez
October 5 – Marc Krauss
October 7 – Alex Cobb
October 9 – Cory Burns
October 9 – Yadiel Hernández
October 10 – Adrian Cardenas
October 10 – Elvin Ramírez
October 14 – Kole Calhoun
October 19 – John Holdzkom
October 20 – Edwar Cabrera
October 21 – Justin De Fratus
October 23 – Félix Doubront
October 23 – Kyle Gibson
October 27 – Jay Jackson
October 27 – Ben Paulsen
October 28 – Casey Lawrence
October 30 – Ryan Kelly
October 31 – Yamaico Navarro

November
November 1 – Anthony Bass
November 1 – Steve Geltz
November 1 – Donnie Joseph
November 3 – Kyle Seager
November 3 – Ryan Tepera
November 6 – Caleb Cotham
November 6 – Cory Rasmus
November 8 – Bryan Shaw
November 11 – Kyle McPherson
November 12 – Mike Leake
November 13 – Tim Adleman
November 16 – Jordan Walden
November 19 – Bryan Holaday
November 20 – Jeff Locke
November 24 – Kelvin Marte
November 24 – Chris Herrmann
November 25 – Grant Dayton
November 25 – Nate Karns
November 30 – Chase Anderson

December
December 3 – Andrew Oliver
December 5 – A. J. Pollock
December 5 – Chris Rearick
December 8 – Kyle Drabek
December 8 – Zach McAllister
December 8 – Alex Torres
December 9 – Buddy Baumann
December 9 – Blake Smith
December 9 – Mat Latos
December 9 – Pedro Villarreal
December 9 – Adam Wilk
December 13 – Aneury Rodríguez
December 15 – Scott Copeland
December 16 – Mickey Jannis
December 16 – Hector Santiago
December 17 – Donovan Solano
December 17 – Travis Tartamella
December 18 – Rex Brothers
December 18 – Rudy Owens
December 19 – Aaron Loup
December 21 – Khris Davis
December 22 – Zack Britton
December 22 – Chad Jenkins
December 23 – Tyler Robertson
December 23 – Jordany Valdespin
December 26 – Mike Minor
December 28 – Shawn O'Malley

Deaths

January
January   1 – Velma Abbott, 57, Canadian infielder who played from 1946 to 1947 in the All-American Girls Professional Baseball League.
January   1 – Norene Arnold, 59, All-American Girls Professional Baseball League pitcher and infielder.
January   1 – Ernie Maun, 85, pitcher who played for the New York Giants in 1924 and the Philadelphia Phillies in 1926.
January   2 – Julio Moreno, 65, Cuban fireball pitcher whose professional career spanned over 30 years, including four Major League Baseball seasons with the Washington Senators from 1950 to 1953. 
January   2 – Bill Upton, 57, relief pitcher for 1954 Philadelphia Athletics.
January   4 – Tony Rensa, 85, backup catcher who played for the New York Yankees, Detroit Tigers, Philadelphia Phillies and Chicago White Sox in part of six seasons spanning 1930–1939.
January   5 – Dale Mitchell, 65, two-time All-Star left fielder who played for the Cleveland Indians and Brooklyn Dodgers in a span of eleven seasons from 1946 through 1956. A career .312 hitter, Mitchell posted a .432 average in his rookie season and hit .300 or better six of the next seven seasons, including a career-high .336 mark in 1948, ending third in the American League batting race behind Ted Williams (.369) and Lou Boudreau (.355), while leading the American League in hits (203), singles (161) and triples (23), helping the Indians win the 1948 World Series, Afterwards, he guided Cleveland to an AL record 111 wins in a 154-game season and the 1954 American League pennant, even though Mitchell is perhaps best remembered, nevertheless unfairly, for making the final out in the perfect game pitched by New York Yankees' Don Larsen in the 1956 World Series against the Dodgers.
January   6 – Margaret Danhauser, 65, outstanding first sacker for the Racine Belles of the All-American Girls Professional Baseball League from 1943 through 1950.
January   8 – Elmer Miller, 83, two-way pitcher for the 1929 Philadelphia Phillies.
January   8 – Phil Seghi, 77, minor league player and manager turned scout and executive; farm and scouting director of the Cincinnati Reds when his club signed Pete Rose in 1960; later, general manager of the Cleveland Indians from 1973 to 1985.
January 10 – Frank Hiller, 66, pitcher who played for the New York Yankees, Chicago Cubs, Cincinnati Reds and New York Giants over six seasons between 1946 and 1953.
January 10 – Frank Makosky, 76. pitcher who played in 1937 for the New York Yankees.
January 13 – Tom Morgan, 56, relief pitcher who played for five different clubs during 12 seasons spanning 1951–1963, being a member of five New York Yankees teams that won World Series titles between 1951 and 1956; later, a pitching coach for three MLB teams between 1972 and 1983. 
January 17 – Ed Busch, 69, shortstop who played from 1943 to 1945 for the Philadelphia Athletics.
January 19 – George Selkirk, 79, two-time All-Star Canadian corner outfielder who played from 1934 through 1942 for the New York Yankees, collecting a .290/.400/.483 slash line with 108 home runs and 576 runs batted in during his nine seasons with the team, helping them win six American League pennants and five World Series titles between 1936 and 1942; later, a minor league manager and MLB front office executive, notably serving as general manager of the Washington Senators from 1963 to 1968.
January 20 – Hank Behrman, 65, pitcher for the Brooklyn Dodgers, Pittsburgh Pirates and New York Giants in a span of four seasons from 1946 to 1949, who also appeared in the 1947 World Series with the National League Champion Dodgers.

February
February   2 – Néstor Lambertus, 80, Dominican-born outfielder who played for the 1929 Cuban Stars East of the American Negro League.
February   2 – Olive Little, 69, Canadian All-Star female pitcher who threw four no-hitters in the All-American Girls Professional Baseball League.
February   5 – Michael Burke, 70, executive; president of the New York Yankees from September 1966 to April 1973, three months after he presided over CBS' sale of the Bombers to George Steinbrenner; briefly a candidate for Commissioner of Baseball in 1969.
February   8 – Larnie Jordan, 72, shortstop for the Philadelphia Stars and New York Black Yankees of the Negro National League between 1940 and 1942.
February   9 – Larry French, 79, All-Star left-handed pitcher and knuckleball specialist, who played for the Pittsburgh Pirates, Chicago Cubs and Brooklyn Dodgers over 14 seasons from 1929 to 1941, compiling a 197–171 record with 1,187 strikeouts and a 3.44 ERA in 3,152 innings, including 40 shutouts and 198 complete games.
February 11 – Bill McGee, 77, pitcher who played from 1935 through 1942 with the St. Louis Cardinals and New York Giants.
February 13 – Leo Norris, 78, third baseman and second baseman who played in 270 games for the Philadelphia Phillies between 1936 and 1937.
February 26 – Eddie Jefferson, 64, pitcher for the Philadelphia Stars of the Negro National League in 1945 and 1946.

March
March   2 – Mo Mozzali, 64, St. Louis Cardinals' MLB hitting coach in 1977 and 1978; minor-league outfielder and longtime member of St. Louis organization as a scout and instructor.
March   3 – Danny Kaye, 76, entertainer and a founding co-owner of the Seattle Mariners from 1976 to 1985.
March   9 – Zeke Bonura, 78, solid defensive first baseman for the Chicago White Sox, Washington Senators, New York Giants and Chicago Cubs in the period between 1934 and 1940, hitting .300 or better in four of his seven seasons with a career-high .345 in 1937, while compiling a .307 batting average with 119 home runs and 704 runs batted in in 917 games.
March 11 – Fred Lucas, 84, who hit a .265 average in 20 games for the 1935 Philadelphia Phillies as a reserve outfielder for Ethan Allen, George Watkins and Johnny Moore.
March 11 – Bots Nekola, 80, pitcher for the New York Yankees in 1929 and the Detroit Tigers in 1933, who later became a long time scout for the Boston Red Sox, being responsible for the signing of future Hall of Famer Carl Yastrzemski.
March 13 – Wayne Osborne, 74, pitcher who played with the Pittsburgh Pirates in the 1935 season and for the Boston Bees in 1936.
March 16 – Bob Kline, 77, well rounded pitcher that started and filled various relief roles, coming out from the bullpen as a closer, middle reliever and set-up man, while playing for the Boston Red Sox, Philadelphia Athletics and Washington Senators from 1930 to 1934.
March 19 – Red Jones, 81, American League umpire, 1944 to 1949; later, a color commentator for Cleveland Indians' TV crew.
March 23 – Tony Pacheco, 59, native of Cuba and longtime minor league infielder and manager who spent six years in the majors as a coach for the Cleveland Indians (1974) and Houston Astros (1976–1979, 1982).
March 25 – Alvin Gipson, 72, pitcher who posted a 7–26 won–lost mark fort the 1941–1946 Birmingham Black Barons of the Negro American League.
March 30 – George Blackerby, 83, backup outfielder for the 1928 Chicago White Sox.

April
April   6 – Bud Morse, 82, second baseman who played his only major league season with the 1929 World Series Champion Philadelphia Athletics, which is considered one of the greatest baseball teams ever assembled.
April 12 – Clarence Isreal, 69, third baseman for the Newark Eagles and Homestead Grays of the Negro National League between 1940 and 1947.
April 19 – Frank McElyea, 68, left fielder for the 1942 Boston Braves.
April 19 – Roy Partlow, 74, southpaw who led Negro National League hurlers in earned run average twice (1939, 1942), was a 1940 All-Star, and 1943 Negro World Series champion as a member of the Homestead Grays; one of first Black ballplayers to sign with the Brooklyn Dodgers in 1945 after Jackie Robinson, and was briefly Robinson's teammate with 1946 Montreal Royals; returned to Negro leagues later in 1946.
April 21 – Haruyasu Nakajima, 77, Hall of Fame Japanese outfielder who played with the Yomiuri Giants and the Taiyo Whales from 1936 to 1951.
April 24 – John Mihalic, 75, second baseman who played for the Washington Senators from 1935 to 1937.
April 27 – John Burrows, 74, pitcher who played from 1943 to 1944 for the Philadelphia Athletics and Chicago Cubs.
April 29 – Bud Bates, 75, backup outfielder for the 1939 Philadelphia Phillies.

May
May   1 – Bobo Holloman, 62, pitcher for the 1953 St. Louis Browns, who made history as the only pitcher in the modern era to throw a no-hitter in his first start.
May   7 – Boom-Boom Beck, 82, pitcher who posted a 38–65 record for seven different teams between 1924 and 1945.
May 14 – Luke Sewell, 86, All-Star catcher who played for four American League teams in a span of 20 seasons from 1921–1942; managed the St. Louis Browns from June 5, 1941 to August 28, 1946, leading the team to their only AL pennant in 1944; later managed the Cincinnati Reds from September 30, 1949 to July 29, 1952; brother Joe was a Hall of Fame second baseman/shortstop.
May 16 – Willie Powell, 83, left-hander who pitched in the Negro National League between 1925 and 1934, mainly for the Chicago American Giants and Detroit Stars; two-time Negro World Series champion; led NNL in ERA (1928) and games lost (1931).
May 31 – Jerry Adair, 50, trustworthy middle infielder and third baseman for four American League teams during 13 seasons from 1958 to 1970, mainly with the Baltimore Orioles, who set then-major league records for single-season fielding average (.994) and fewest errors (5) in 1964.
May 31 – Jack Sheehan, 94, middle infielder and third baseman for the Brooklyn Robins from 1920 to 1921; managed in the minors between 1916 and 1953; also a scout and executive, working as farm director of the Chicago Cubs in the late 1940s and early 1950s, and scouting director for the expansion Washington Senators of the 1960s.

June
June 6 – Barney Koch, 64, second baseman for the 1944 Brooklyn Dodgers.
June 7 – Shosei Go, 70, Hall of Fame pitcher and outfielder that played in the Japanese Baseball League and NPB with the Tokyo Kyojin, the Hanshin/Osaka Tigers and the Mainichi Orions from 1937 to 1957.
June 13 – Huck Betts, 90, reliable starting and relief pitcher who played for the Philadelphia Phillies and Boston Braves in a span of ten seasons from 1920 to 1935, posting a 61–68 record and 3.93 ERA in 307 appearances, including 53 complete games, eight shutouts, 128 games finished and 16 saves. 
June 15 – George Smith, 49, Negro leagues second baseman who played for the Indianapolis Clowns and the Chicago American Giants between 1952 and 1957, before joining the Detroit Tigers from 1963 through 1965 and the Boston Red Sox in 1966.
June 15 – Don White, 68, outfielder who played for the Philadelphia Athletics in the 1948 and 1949 seasons. 
June 17 – Dick Howser, 51, All-Star shortstop, World Series-winning manager, and coach; played eight seasons for three American League clubs, including standout debut campaign (second in 1961 Rookie of the Year balloting); longtime third-base coach (1969–1978) of New York Yankees and manager of 1980 Bombers, guiding them to division title but resigning after 1980 ALCS in support of his embattled coach, Mike Ferraro; head baseball coach at his alma mater, Florida State University (1979); best known for managing the Kansas City Royals, taking over the club in mid-1981 and leading it to its first World Series championship in 1985; forced to sidelines after managing the AL to a victory in the 1986 MLB All-Star game, when he was diagnosed with a malignant brain tumor that claimed his life 11 months later. 
June 18 – Schoolboy Johnny Taylor, 71, All-Star pitcher who hurled for three Negro National League clubs between 1935 and 1944.
June 21 – Phil Weintraub, 79, fourth outfielder and first baseman who posted a .295 batting average and slugged .440 for four National League teams in seven seasons from 1993 to 1945, being also one of only three batters to collect 11 runs batted in in a single game while playing for the 1944 New York Giants.
June 24 – Fred Newman, 45, pitcher who played for the Los Angeles/California Angels over six seasons from 1962 to 1967. 
June 26 – Jay Avrea, 67, pitcher for the 1950 Cincinnati Reds.
June 28 – Bill Schuster, 74, shortstop who played with the Pittsburgh Pirates, Boston Bees and Chicago Cubs over five seasons spanning 1937–1945, as well as a member of the Cubs team that won the National League pennant in 1945, scoring the winning run in the team's last victory in a World Series game before the 2016 series.

July
July 11 – Joe Bennett, 87, third baseman for the 1923 Philadelphia Phillies.
July 12 – Joseph Burns, 98, outfielder who played with the Cincinnati Reds in 1910 and for the Detroit Tigers in 1913.
July 15 – Lee Ballanfant, 91, "baseball lifer" as a minor-league player and manager, National League umpire from 1936 to 1957 (working in four World Series and four All-Star games), then a scout until retiring at age 86 in 1981; spent 67 years in Organized Baseball.
July 15 – Bill Ricks, 67, standout pitcher for 1944–1948 Philadelphia Stars of the Negro National League; as a rookie, led his league in victories, games and innings pitched, and strikeouts; four years later, led NNL in earned run average; 1942 All-Star.
July 16 – Rube Novotney, 62, catcher who played in 1949 for the Chicago Cubs.
July 19 – Bob Smith, 92, who started his career at shortstop but was turned into a pitcher, becoming one of the workhorses of the Boston Braves and Bees pitching staffs during the 1920s and 1930s, throwing and losing a 22-inning complete game in 1927 (the third-longest marathon feat in major league history), pitching 200 or more innings six times and saving 41 games, while compiling 106 wins and 3.94 ERA in 435 games over 2.246 innings in a span of 13 seasons from 1925 to 1937, including stints with the Chicago Cubs and Cincinnati Reds between 1931 and 1933.
July 20 – Tom Winsett, 77, left fielder who played for the Boston Red Sox, St. Louis Cardinals and Brooklyn Dodgers in part of seven seasons spanning 1930–1938. 
July 21 – Hughie Wise, 81, catcher who played two games for 1930 Detroit Tigers; later, minor-league manager and longtime MLB scout.
July 22 – Don McMahon, 57, All-Star relief pitcher who played for seven teams over 18 seasons spanning 1957–1974, leading the National League with 15 saves in 1959, while winning two World Series rings with the 1957 Milwaukee Braves and the 1968 Detroit Tigers; also a pitching coach for three MLB clubs for a dozen years between 1972 and 1985.
July 27 – Travis Jackson, 83, Hall of Fame and slick fielding shortstop for the New York Giants from 1922 through 1936, who batted over .300 six times, compiling a .291 lifetime average and driving in 90 or more runs three times, reaching 101 in 1934, while leading the National League shortstops in assists four times, in fielding chances three years, and in fielding average and double plays twice, helping the Giants win three NL pennants and the World Series Championship in 1933.

August
August   5 – Jocko Conlon, 89, middle infielder and third baseman who played for the Boston Braves in its 1923 season.
August   8 – Juan Antonio Yanes, 85, who for more than three decades was one of the leading promoters of Venezuelan baseball both in the amateur and professional fields.
August 11 – John McGillen, 70, pitcher who made two appearances for the Philadelphia Athletics during the 1944 season.
August 21 – Frank Callaway, 89, middle infielder and third baseman who played from 1921 to 1922 for the Philadelphia Athletics.
August 31 – Dick Young, 69, longtime New York sportswriter known for his hard-hitting style.

September
September   1 – Pinky Whitney, 82, All-Star and top defensive third baseman for the Philadelphia Phillies and Boston Braves through 12 seasons from 1928 to 1936, who batted .300 or better four times, collecting four 100-RBI seasons and 200 hits twice and batting a career-high .342 with 117 RBI in 1930, while leading all National League third basemen in assists and double plays in four seasons, and in putouts and fielding average three times.
September   2 – Cam Carreon, 50, catcher for the Chicago White Sox, Cleveland Indians and Baltimore Orioles over all or part of eight seasons from 1959 to 1966.
September 13 – Charlie Parks, 70, catcher in the Negro National League between 1938 and 1947 who mainly played for the Newark Eagles; member of 1946 Negro World Series champion club.
September 16 – Kermit Wahl, 64, third baseman and middle infielder who played for the Cincinnati Reds, Philadelphia Athletics and St. Louis Browns in all or part of five seasons spanning 1944–1951.
September 21 – Jimmy Johnson, 68, southpaw who pitched for the Negro leagues' Toledo–Indianapolis Crawfords in 1939 and 1940.

October
October 12 – Snake Henry, 92, first baseman for the Boston Braves from 1922 to 1923, whose greatest achievements were in Minor League Baseball, where he posted a .302 lifetime batting average in 24 seasons, collecting more than 3,200 hits and two MVP Awards, serving also as a manager for the Kinston Eagles in 1939.
October 17 – Pete Cote, 85, utility man for the 1926 New York Giants.
October 24 – Ray Sheppard, 84, infielder (primarily a third baseman and shortstop) who played for six Negro leagues teams between 1924 and 1932.
October 28 – Pete McClanahan, 81, who was used as a pinch-hitter by the Pittsburgh Pirates in its 1931 season.

November
November   9 – Ed Cihocki, 80, middle infielder and third baseman for the Philadelphia Athletics over part of two seasons from 1932 to 1933.
November 10 – Bubby Sadler, 78, shortstop who played in Negro leagues and with Black barnstorming teams between 1934 and 1944; inducted in 1999 to Delaware Sports Museum and Hall of Fame.
November 14 – Hod Lisenbee, 89, pitcher who played for the Washington Senators, Boston Red Sox, Philadelphia Athletics and Cincinnati Reds in a span of eight seasons from 1927 to 1935, whose notable accomplishment came in his rookie season, when he faced the New York Yankees six times and won the first five outings against the storied 1927 Murderers' Row, allowing three hits without a walk and striking out Babe Ruth and Tony Lazzeri in three innings of relief in his debut against them at Yankee Stadium, while posting an 18–9 record for the third place Senators and leading the American League pitchers with four shutouts.
November 16 – Jim Brewer, 50, All-Star relief pitcher who played for three clubs in a 17-year career from 1960 to 1976, posting a 69–65 record with a 3.07 ERA and 132 saves, while helping the Los Angeles Dodgers win three National League pennants and the 1965 World Series title.
November 17 – Paul Derringer, 81, six-time All-Star pitcher who played 15 seasons from 1931 through 1945 for the St. Louis Cardinals, Cincinnati Reds and Chicago Cubs, and he made an impressive debut with the Cardinals, winning 18 games for the eventual 1931 World Series champions and leading the NL in win–loss record (.692), including a streak of 33 consecutive scoreless innings in September, later winning 20 games for Cincinnati four times between 1935 and 1940, along with a 25–7 season in 1939, as the Reds won the NL pennant for the first time in 20 years, as well as pitching complete game wins in Games 4 and 7 of the 1940 World Series, guiding Cincinnati to its first Series title in 21 years.
November 19 – Dave Odom, 69, pitcher who played for the Boston Braves in its 1943 season.
November 21 – Dusty Cooke, 80, fourth outfielder for the New York Yankees, Boston Red Sox and Cincinnati Reds over eight seasons spanning 1930–1938; played multiple post-World War II roles for the Philadelphia Phillies including athletic trainer (1946–1947), coach (1948–1952), and interim manager (July 16 to 25, 1948).
November 24 – Jim Russell, 69, outfielder who played from 1942 through 1951 for the Pittsburgh Pirates (1942–1947), Boston Braves (1948–1949) and Brooklyn Dodgers (1950–1951).
November 27 – Babe Herman, 84, right fielder whose career spanned five different franchises in all or part of 13 seasons between 1926 and 1945, including stints with the Brooklyn Robins (1926–1931) and Dodgers (1945), who was a career .324 hitter and runner-up for the National League batting crown in 1929 with a .381 average, behind Philadelphia Phillies' Lefty O'Doul (.398), and in 1930 with a .393 mark, surpassed by New Tork Giants' Bill Terry (.401) and also the best in Dodgers history, being one of four big leaguers to hit for the cycle three times (twice in 1931), while setting other Dodgers records in a single season that lasted more than twenty years, including more home runs (35) and most total bases (416), although his career was overshadowed by a litany of injuries and for his baserunning and fielding lapses.
November 29 – Spencer Alexander, 71, outfielder for the 1940–1941 Newark Eagles of the Negro National League.

December
December   4 – Carlos Colás, 70, Cuban catcher whose career included stints with the Negro leagues' New York Cubans and Memphis Red Sox, and service in the Mexican League; brother of José Colás.
December   6 – Jim Johnson, 42, pitcher for the 1970 San Francisco Giants.
December   7 – Ken Richardson, 72, infield and outfield utility man who played with the Philadelphia Athletics in 1942 and for the Philadelphia Phillies in 1946.
December 10 – Whitey Moore, 75, pitcher for the Cincinnati Reds and St. Louis Cardinals in a span of six seasons from 1936 to 1942, including the Reds team that won the 1940 World Series championship.
December 10 – Ollie West, 73, pitcher/outfielder whose 1942–1945 career was largely spent with the Chicago American Giants of the Negro American League.
December 20 – Jake Eisenhart, 65, pitcher who played briefly with the Cincinnati Reds in its 1944 season.
December 21 – Joe Sherman, 97, pitcher for the 1915 Philadelphia Athletics.
December 22 – Bobby Hogue, 66, pitcher who appeared in 172 Major League games over five seasons from 1948 to 1952 for the Boston Braves, St. Louis Browns and New York Yankees, also a member of the 1951 World Series champion Yankees.
December 24 – Nino Espinosa, 34, pitcher for the New York Mets, Philadelphia Phillies and Toronto Blue Jays during eight seasons from 1974 to 1981.
December 27 – Lefty Holmes, 80, pitcher whose Negro leagues career spanned 1929 to 1940, and included service on six different teams; brother of Philly Holmes.

Sources

External links

Major League Baseball official website 
Minor League Baseball official website
Baseball Almanac – Major League Baseball Players Who Died in 1987